The Tupolev Tu-134 (NATO reporting name: Crusty) is a twin-engined, narrow-body jet airliner built in the Soviet Union for short and medium-haul routes from 1966 to 1989. The original version featured a glazed-nose design and, like certain other Russian airliners (including its sister model the Tu-154), it can operate from unpaved airfields.

One of the most widely used aircraft in former Comecon countries, the number in active service is decreasing because of operational safety concerns and noise restrictions. The model has seen long-term service with some 42 countries, with some European airlines having scheduled as many as 12 daily takeoffs and landings per plane. In addition to regular passenger service, it has also been used in various air force, army and navy support roles; for pilot and navigator training; and for aviation research and test projects. In recent years, a number of Tu-134s have been converted for use as VIP transports and business jets. A total of 854 Tu-134s were built of all versions (including test bed examples) with Aeroflot as the largest user; by 1995, the Tu-134 had carried 360 million passengers for that airline.

Design and development 

Following the introduction of engines mounted on pylons on the rear fuselage by the French Sud Aviation Caravelle, airliner manufacturers around the world rushed to adopt the new layout. Its advantages included clean wing airflow without disruption by nacelles or pylons and decreased cabin noise. At the same time, placing heavy engines that far back created challenges with the location of the centre of gravity in relation to the centre of lift, which was at the wings. To make room for the engines, the tailplanes had to be relocated to the tail fin, which had to be stronger and therefore heavier, further compounding the tail-heavy arrangement.

During a 1960 visit to France, Soviet leader Nikita Khrushchev was so impressed by the quiet cabin of the Caravelle, that on 1 August 1960 the Tupolev OKB received an official directive to create the Tu-124A with a similar engine arrangement. The requirement was also driven by the need to replace slow, aging piston-engined Il-14s on domestic routes. In 1961, the Soviet state airline, Aeroflot, updated its requirement specifications to include greater payload and passenger capacity.

The first Tu-124A prototype, SSSR-45075, first flew on 29 July 1963. On 22 October 1963, the prototype British BAC One-Eleven, which had a similar layout, crashed with the loss of all crew while testing its stalling properties. The aircraft had entered pitch-up: the high-mounted tailplane became trapped in the turbulent wake produced by the wings (deep stall), which prevented recovery from the stall. As a result, the tailplane on Tu-124A was enlarged by 30% for greater control authority. Since Aeroflot's requirements dictated a larger aircraft than initially planned, the Soloviev Design Bureau developed the more powerful D-30 low-bypass turbofan engines. On 20 November 1963, the new airliner was designated Tu-134.

Design curiosities of the Tu-134 included a sharp wing sweepback of 35 degrees, compared to 25–28 degrees in its counterparts. The engines on early production Tu-134s lacked thrust reversers, which made the aircraft one of the few airliners to use a brake parachute for landing. The majority of onboard electronics operated on direct current. The lineage of early Soviet airliners could be traced directly to the Tupolev Tu-16 strategic bomber, and the Tu-134 carried over the glass nose for the navigator and the landing gear fitted with low-pressure tires to permit operation from unpaved airfields.

Serial production began in 1966 at the Kharkov Aviation Production Association, and production of the Tu-124 was discontinued. The Tu-134 was designed for short-haul lines with low passenger traffic. Originally the aircraft had 56 seats in a single class configuration, or 50 seats in a two-class configuration.

In 1968, Tupolev began work on an improved Tu-134 variant with a 76-seat capacity. The fuselage received a  plug for greater passenger capacity and an auxiliary power unit in the tail. As a result, the maximum range was reduced from 3,100 kilometers to 2,770 kilometers. The upgraded D-30 engines now featured thrust reversers, replacing the parachute. The first Tu-134A, converted from a production Tu-134, flew on 22 April 1969. The first airline flight was on 9 November 1970. An upgraded version, the Tu-134B began production in 1980, with the navigator position abandoned, and seating capacity increased to 96 seats. Efforts subsequently began to develop a Tu-134D with increased engine thrust, but the project was cancelled.

Operational history 

In September 1967, the Tu-134 made its first scheduled flight from Moscow to Adler. The Tu-134 was the first Soviet airliner to receive international certification from the International Civil Aviation Organization, which permitted it to be used on international routes. Due to this certification, Aeroflot used most of its Tu-134s on international routes.  In 1968, the first export customers, Interflug of East Germany, LOT Polish Airlines and Malév Hungarian Airlines purchased the Tu-134. In 1969, the Tu-134 was displayed at the Paris Air Show.

From 1972, Aeroflot began placing the Tu-134 in domestic service to Baku, Yerevan, Kyiv, Kishinev, Krasnodar, Leningrad, Omsk, Riga, and Sochi from Sheremetyevo International Airport in Moscow.

In its early years, the Tu-134 developed a reputation for reliability and efficiency, especially when compared with previous Soviet designs. After the establishment of tougher noise standards in the ICAO regulations in 2002, the Tu-134 was banned from most western European airports for its high noise levels. In early 2006, 245 Tu-134s were still in operation, 162 of which were in Russia. After a fatal accident in March 2007, and at the instigation of Russian Minister of Transportation Igor Levitin, Aeroflot announced that it would be retiring its fleet, and the last Tu-134 was removed from service on 1 January 2008. Some were still in operations with Aeroflot subsidiaries on local routes within Russia. The Tu-134 also found a new life as a business jet with many having an expensive business interior installed. High fuel and maintenance costs are increasingly limiting the number used today.

In June 2011, as a response to RusAir Flight 9605 which resulted in 47 fatalities, Russian president Dmitry Medvedev ordered preparations for taking the Tu-134 out of use by 2012.

On 22 May 2019, the final passenger flight of the Tu-134 in Russia took place.

Many Tu-134s have been preserved as memorials at airports throughout the former Soviet Union. A former Malév Tu-134A (registration HA-LBE) is on display at the Aeropark at Budapest Ferenc Liszt International Airport in Hungary.

Variants 

Tu-134
The glass-nosed version. The first series could seat up to 64 passengers, and this was later increased to 72 passengers. The original designation was Tu-124A.

Tu-134A
Second series, with upgraded engines, improved avionics, seating up to 84 passengers. All Tu-134A variants have been built with the distinctive glass nose and chin radar dome, but some were modified to the B standard with the radar moved to the nose radome.
Tu-134A-2
The glass nose was replaced.
Tu-134A-3
Second series, powered by two updated Soloviev D-30 turbofan engines.
Tu-134A-5
Most recent version.
Tu-134B
Second series, 80 seats, radar moved to the nose radome, eliminating the glazed nose. Some Tu-134B models have long-range fuel tanks fitted under the fuselage; these are visible as a sizable bulge.
Tu-134BV
Space shuttle work model.
Tu-134LK
Cosmonaut training version.

Tu-134M
Projected modernized version of Tu-134B, powered by Progress D-436T1-134 engines.
Tu-134S
Projected cargo version based on Tu-134A.
Tu-134UBL
Tu-160 crew training version, with Tu-160 nose cone.
Tu-134UBK
Naval version of Tu-134UBL. Only one was ever built.
Tu-134BSh
Tu-22M crew trainer, fitted with a Tu-22M radar in the nose.
Tu-134Sh-1
Crew trainer with bomb racks for heavy bomber crews
Tu-134Sh-2
navigator trainer for tactical bomber crews
Tu-134SKh
Crop survey version.

Current operators

Current civil operators
As of 2022, just two Tupolev Tu-134s remain in civil passenger airline service worldwide:

 Air Koryo (2)

Current military operators
The following states still operate the Tu-134 for military and other government purposes:

 Armed Forces of the Republic of Kazakhstan

 Russian Air Force – 1449th Air Base located at Tambov
 Russian Naval Aviation
 Russian Coast Guard
 Russian Presidential Transport Flight

 Syrian Air Force

 Ukrainian Air Force - 15th Transport Aviation Brigade "Aircraft Designer Oleg Antonov" located at Boryspil International Airport

Former operators

The following airlines, states and other entities at one point operated at least one Tu-134 aircraft:

Former civil operators

Former military operators

Accidents and incidents

Specifications (Tu-134A)

See also

References

Sources

External links 

1960s Soviet airliners
Tu-0134
Twinjets
T-tail aircraft
Aircraft first flown in 1963
Low-wing aircraft
Kharkiv Aviation Factory aircraft